Suresh Shyamlal Gupta is an Indian politician, trade union leader, and social activist. He is the founder and president of the All Indian Cine Workers Association (AICWA). He has been elected Mumbai President for the youth wing of the Indian National Trade Union Congress, and one of the committee members of the Government of Maharashtra in the area of industries, labor, and energy. Suresh Gupta is known to have busted an illegal kidney racket of Hiranandani Hospital owners Niranjan Hiranandani and Surendra Hiranandani in 2016. Following this incident, a CBI inquiry into the murder of an eyewitness of Hiranandani Hospital was demanded. He once objected to the Web series Sacred Games, as to the profound use to profanity and for displaying fake scenes against former Prime Minister Rajiv Gandhi which streams on Netflix. He also banned Pakistani artists and singers in India during the Pulwama terror attack. Gupta wrote a letter to External Affairs Minister Sushma Swaraj asking Pakistani artists to be deported and their visas canceled. Popular singer Mika Singh was also banned from the Indian film industry by Suresh Gupta for performing live at the wedding ceremony of General Pervez Musharraf's relatives after the Pulwama attack in Karachi.

Early life and education
Suresh Gupta was born to Shyamlal Gupta & Premadevi Gupta on 26 March 1988, in Mumbai, Maharashtra. He was educated at Sandesh Vidyalaya School until lv std and then at RAUBS school ( V to X), Mumbai. Suresh Gupta was admitted to S.K.Somaiya college  Xl & Xll std and then obtained his bachelor's degree in Electronics and  Telecommunication Engineering at Padmabhushan Vasantdada Patil Pratisthan College of Engineering, Mumbai.

He is the son of the late Congress leader Shyamlal Sohanlal Gupta. His father was a Businessman and Politician. His ancestral village is Shantipuram, Phaphamau, Prayagraj, Uttar Pradesh.

He has four siblings, all in the profession of business.

Political career 

Suresh Gupta started his political career in the early days of college. He joined the Indian National Congress (INC) in 2006 in the presence of Gurudas Kamat. He joined Seva Dal Congress as Ward President and a year later was elected as Taluka President of Seva Dal Congress in his constituency. In 2009, Suresh Gupta was elected as the Ward President of the Youth Congress. In 2013, he was appointed as the Mumbai President of the Youth Wing of the Indian National Trade Union Congress (INTUC). Later in 2014, he became the National Secretary of Youth Wing of the Indian National Trade Union Congress. He also raised the issue of the SRA project in which builders cheated poor people by not giving them houses. In 2012 he raised the issue of illegal mining in Mumbai, where top developers illegally excavated the mountain. Suresh works to ensure the rights of workers and artists working in the Indian film industry. According to Gupta, the workers working in the Indian film industry are not getting adequate facilities. According to him, the workers working in the film industry are forced to work for 16 to 20 hours and are paid less in return. Along with this, they are also abused mentally and physically, as well as women are molested on the shooting sets and Also no PF, no security, no fire safety on set, no hygiene food, no medical ESIC, no leave, etc. Whereas the annual revenue to the government due to the Indian film industry is 2 lakh crores per year. Because of this, Suresh Gupta established the All Indian Cine Workers Association to address the complaints from the Indian film industry, which helps the workers and artists of the Indian film industry to get their basic rights. In 2019, he sparked a revolution by holding a meeting with the Ministry of Labour(Maharashtra), in which the Leader of the Opposition of Maharashtra, Radhakrishna Vikhe Patil, and Maharashtra Labour Minister Sambhaji Nilangekar and other government high officials were present. Because of Gupta's effort, the Government of Maharashtra decided to form a government committee for the rights of workers and artists of the Indian film industry, in which he became the employee representative of that committee.

Union leadership 

Aiming for the betterment of the Indian cine workers and artists, Suresh Shyamlal Gupta established a non-profitable organization AlCWA (All Indian Cine Workers Association) in 2016. Believing in the motto of putting cine workers first, the organization aims at taking the voice of the workers to the government and fighting for their rights and heeding to the needs of the workers.
Since its foundation, the organization has been a part of numerous news and controversies. Some of them include putting a ban on Pakistani actors after 2019 Pulwama attack, boycotting and banning Mika Singh from the film industry after Singh performed at a wedding in Pakistan.

Suresh took initiative to sort out the issues of artists, workers, or laborers of the Indian Film Industry with the support of MLA Shri Radhakrishna Vikhe Patil (Opposition Leader – Maharashtra Legislative Assembly) in presence of Shri Sambhaji Nilgekar ( Labour Minister of Maharashtra) and other higher officers valuable meeting was conducted on that meeting first-time decision was taken by Government of Maharashtra to form a committee for welfare and rights of artists, workers, and laborers in Indian Film Industry.

Exposed Illegal Kidney Racket 
In 2016, Suresh Gupta busted a kidney racket at Hiranandani Hospital in Mumbai. His efforts have led to a change in the law on kidney transplantation in Maharashtra. This incident resulted in the arrest of more than 20 people, including doctors, agents, and many others. Hiranandani Hospital CEO Chatterjee and several doctors were also arrested.

Certain types of keywords were being used for illegal kidneys in Hiranandani Hospital, after which many illegal kidney rackets were busted in Maharashtra and many places in India.

Fraudulent documents prepared for donors and recipients for an illegal kidney transplant that showed fraudulent family ties between them. High-profile people were involved in this case. Key witness and victim Sundar Singh Jatav, through a friend, approached Suresh Gupta for help uncovering this complex kidney trafficking network. Soon after the FIR was registered, Sundar started receiving death threats.

Cine Vista Studio Incident 
After a fire broke out at Cine Vista Studios in Kanjurmarg, this enraged Suresh Gupta, as a crew member had died due to the negligence of the studio owners, the production house, and the producer.

He stated,"The death of the crew member was due to the negligence of the studio owners, production houses and producers." The members of the union repeatedly complained about the lack of fire safety measures, but the studio ignored it and did not follow the fire fighting system, which led to the incident.

Controversy on Web Series Sacred Games 
To defame the late Prime Minister of India Rajiv Gandhi, Suresh voiced and filed a complaint against top OTT service provider Netflix, actor Nawazuddin Siddiqui, director Anurag Kashyap, Vikramaditya Motwane, and the producer of the web series "Sacred Games" at Chembur police station on July 11, 2018. According to Suresh, in the fourth episode of the first season of this series, lead actor Nawazuddin Siddiqui is shown abusing Prime Minister Rajiv Gandhi. Gupta also mentioned in his complaint how the show defied Parliament's decision on the Shah Bano case.

Letter to PM to ban Pakistani artists 
Suresh has written a letter to Hon'ble Prime Minister of India Narendra Modi pleading complete ban on Pakistani artists after Pakistan Govt. banned the release of Indian films in its country.

Demanded to ban on Pakistani Artists after 2019 Pulwama Attack 

Following the terror attack by Pakistan-based terrorist organization Jaish-e-Mohammed (JeM) in Jammu and Kashmir's Pulwama, Suresh Gupta-led All Indian Cine Workers Association announced a complete ban on Pakistani actors and artists. Suresh Gupta said the attack was "cowardly" and the most shameful act Pakistan has ever done, it will take strict action against anyone working with Pakistani artists.

Suresh Gupta, through his organization AICWA, wrote a letter to External Affairs Minister Sushma Swaraj on February 19, demanding the deportation of Pakistani artists and cancellation of their visas after the Pulwama terror attack. He said, 'The nation comes first and it stands with the nation at the time of such horrific and inhuman acts'.

Petition in Lahore High Court 
After the Pulwama terror attack in Jammu and Kashmir, the AICWA President completely banned Pakistani artists and singers. In protest, Pakistani national Sheikh Latif moved to the Lahore High Court, seeking a ban on the trade of Indian films in Pakistan.

They demanded a CBI inquiry into the suicide of a key witness in the kidney racket 
Suresh Gupta demanded a CBI inquiry into the suspected death of kidney racket key witness Sunder Singh Jatav in 2016 as he claimed it was not a case of suicide. Gupta alleged that bloodstains were found on the floor of Singh's residence.

Gupta said that I think he was murdered as he was a strong witness and stood against powerful people, Gupta demanded a detailed investigation to find out the truth.

Gupta added that Singh feared for his life and had sought protection from Powai police station in 2016. No complaint was registered even though he was the star witness in the Hiranandani hospital kidney racket case.

Demand for investigation of the incident in Vikhroli 
After the death of four people in Vikhroli, social worker Suresh Gupta made serious allegations against the BMC, saying that "the cement chamber was not made properly, so this accident happened. It is a man-made disaster and the BMC is responsible for it. We demand the registration of an FIR against the responsible officer who gave the green signal for this work and a compensation of Rs. 30 lakh for each of the deceased."

An oxygen cylinder burst accident occurred 
On the death of a person in Vikhroli due to the explosion of an oxygen cylinder landing at a shop, Suresh Gupta said, "I will write a letter to the Chief Minister and the Mumbai Police Commissioner seeking action against the shopkeeper." With so many residential complexes in and around the area, so many lives are being put at risk.

The reaction of Suresh Gupta to the decision to abolish Article 370 and Article 35A 
After the ban on Bollywood films by Pakistan, Suresh Gupta said that the Indian film industry and laborers should not work closely with Pakistani filmmakers, artists, and business partners. Following that, the AICWA President wrote a formal request to the Honorable Prime Minister of India, Narendra Modi, seeking a ban on Pakistani artists, diplomats, and bilateral relations. In an official statement on behalf of the association, Gupta said that there should be no bilateral relations with Pakistani artists, diplomats, businessmen, or citizens of Pakistan. At the same time, Gupta praised Home Minister Amit Shah and Prime Minister Narendra Modi for their bold decisions to abolish Article 370 and Article 35A.

Singer Mika Singh was banned 

When Mika Singh performed at a wedding in Pakistan, Suresh Gupta banned and boycotted Mika Singh from the film industry. Suresh Gupta protested outside the Mika Singh House after performing at an event in Pakistan at a ceremony attended by a relative of a former dictator General Pervez Musharraf. "AICWA activists will ensure that no one in India works with Mika Singh and if anyone does so, they will have to face legal consequences," he said in a statement. Suresh Gupta also requested the intervention of the Ministry of Information and Broadcasting in this regard.

Controversy over Ekta Kapoor's web series 
On June 10, 2020, the All Indian Cine Workers Association, led by Suresh Gupta, released an official statement citing allegedly derogatory scenes in Indian producer Ekta Kapoor's "XXX (web series)". According to Gupta, the Indian Army has been humiliated in some scenes of the web series, for which he has demanded an FIR against Ekta Kapoor and ALT Balaji production, and has also written a letter to the Ministry of Information and Broadcasting which reads, "Content platform on OTT: Set up a censor board to control visuals and obscenity."

Demand to ban Punjabi film 'Chal Mera Putt' 
AICWA President Suresh Gupta demanded a ban on the Punjabi film Chal Mera Putt as it featured Pakistani actors instead of Bollywood actors. Due to this, Gupta sent a formal letter banning the film to the Chief Minister of Punjab, Captain Amarinder Singh, and a copy of the same to the Hon'ble Shri Prakash Javadekar (Information and Broadcasting Minister), and Shri Prasoon Joshi (chairman, Central Film Board).

Opinion on New Film City in UP 
After Yogi Adityanath announced a new film city in Uttar Pradesh, Suresh Gupta said, "By the way, shooting of many films is going on in Lucknow. It is possible sometimes but not many films will be shot. Women feel safe in Mumbai. There are around 30 percent women associated with film industry in Mumbai. I doubt if the freedom to work day and night be available to them there?"

Letter to the Chief Minister of Maharashtra for Relief Fund for Cine Workers 
Seeking a relief fund for cine workers who are not working due to the COVID-19 pandemic, AICWA President Suresh Gupta has written to Chief Minister Uddhav Thackeray requesting that "the Indian film industry has a revenue of over Rs 2 trillion." but is unable to feed a large portion of its laborers, who are daily wage earners. Therefore, to draw the attention of the Maharashtra government to this issue, Suresh, the President of AICWA, wrote a letter informing the Maharashtra chief and seeking financial assistance.

Raised voice against the negligence of the COVID-19 pandemic 

During the first wave of the COVID-19 pandemic, while a complete lockdown was in force as per the government guidelines, from 19 to 31 March 2020, all shootings were also halted. AICWA President Suresh Gupta said that in fact, some shooting was still not stopped and the safety instructions were not followed. Only half of the shooting in Goregaon Firm City was stopped, with the rest continuing without regard for safety guidelines. Even after the notification was issued by Dr. Pradeep Vyas, Principal Secretary, Health Department, safety hygiene should have been followed during the shooting, but all the safety hygiene was neglected. Apart from this issue, Suresh Shyamlal Gupta, president of the All Indian Cine Workers Association, raised his voice to stop the increasing cases of mental stress and suicide due to non-payment of wages and work to the workers during the lockdown.

Demands SIT probe into art director Raju Sapte suicide 
Suresh Gupta has demanded an SIT probe into the suicide of noted art director Raju Sapte. On their demand, the matter was raised in the Maharashtra Legislative Assembly in which a meeting was held under the leadership of Home Minister Dilip Walse-Patil and State Home Minister Satej Patil, and orders were issued for strict action against the culprits. In this case, by writing a letter to the Maharashtra government, Gupta has highlighted the association of the named accused with the federation. Suresh Gupta, president of All India Cine Workers Association, said, “While Shrivastava has been given anticipatory bail in the Sapte case, we hope the Pune police will soon question him in connection with Sapte’s suicide case. Sapte had named him in his suicide note.”

Demand to ban Hindi film 'Why I Killed Gandhi' 
The All Indian Cine Workers Association led by Suresh Gupta has written to the Prime Minister of India, Narendra Modi, demanding a complete ban on the film "Why I Killed Gandhi" as the film glorifies Nathuram Godse, the assassin of the Father of the Nation Mahatma Gandhi.

Suresh Gupta said that Gandhiji's ideology is a symbol of love and sacrifice for every Indian and India will never forget the contribution of Mahatma Gandhi toward a democratic nation. Nathuram Godse is not worthy of respect by anyone in this country, the actor of this film who played the role of Nathuram Godse is a member of the Lok Sabha and a member of the Indian Constitution who is under oath. If this film is released, it will be a reminder of the heinous crime of 30 January 1948 and his organization will protest all over India.

Raised the issues of film industry during Bharat Jodo Yatra  

During Bharat Jodo Yatra, Suresh Shyamlal Gupta met Rahul Gandhi and apprised him about the condition of Cine Workers. The film industry is currently an Unorganized Sector which lacs Safety, Security and Shelter of small Artists and Workers. Gupta urged Gandhi to become the voice of film industry and transform it to an Organized Sector. Demonetization, G.S.T. and Covid-19 have affected the industry badly and being an Unorganized Sector, the workers of cine industry have no access to any funding/aid for health, insurance, housing and training for upgradation of technical skills. Small production houses, producers and channels had to shut down their operations, which led to unemployment for many cine workers. Since Independence, workers associated with the film industry have consistently been kept out of the purview of any pro-labor legislation passed by the Central and State Governments.

Letter to the Chief Minister of Maharashtra for SIT for Tunisha Sharma Suicide Case 

AICWA President Suresh Shyamlal Gupta has written a letter to the Government of Maharashtra Chief Minister Eknath Shinde urging Special Investigation Team ( SIT ) in the case to probe the actress Tunisha Sharma's death case. AICWA president said many things would come out after the investigation.
According to her, women are not safe on the sets. The sets are in very interior places where people are afraid to move. Government should pay attention to this matter.

Suresh said that he was shocked to know that the actress committed suicide on the shooting set, as this has never happened in the history of the Indian film industry. According to Suresh, the number of suicides in the television industry is increasing day by day and it is being ignored as a result of heartbreak. However, the same logic cannot be attached to every incident. The entire industry is in danger and to ensure the safety of all those associated with the said industry, the main culprits inherent in the said industry, the instigators of such suicides must be exposed.

Suresh Gupta said I have also spoken to leader of opposition Ajit Pawar and Maharashtra Pradesh Congress Committee President Nana Patole regarding this matter, this issue and the issue of security on the set and junior artists will be raised in the Maharashtra Legislative Assembly. Along with this, Suresh Gupta also said that Sheezan Mohammad Khan should have a Narco Test because I came to know that Tunisha Sharma was talking to him during the shooting and after asking for a break, she went to the make-up room and remained locked inside. Only Sheezan Khan knows what happened when the set men brought down Tunisha Sharma's body.

Demand from Chief Minister for establishing security measures at Filmcity 
A makeup artist was attacked by a leopard in Filmcity. Talking about this, Suresh Shyamlal Gupta told the media that such incidents have taken place earlier as well and he requested the government of Maharashtra to take some security measures. Gupta said, “I have told Chief Minister Eknath Shinde such incidents had happened many times and I demand to know who will guarantee the safety of cine workers from a leopard that comes again and again in the Film City?
Suresh said, “The incident happened near the helipad where actor Akshay Kumar & Tiger Shroff’s upcoming movie Bade Miyan Chote Miyan is being shot. In a film city built on three hundred acres, there is no facility of even street lights. The lack of lights is the actual reason why such accidents are happening continuously.”

Demanded Strict Action against the attack on Sonu Nigam 
AICWA President Suresh Shyamlal Gupta condemned the incident that took place during one of Singer Sonu Nigam’s recent concerts. In an interview with Times Now, Gupta stated, “If a veteran singer Like Sonu Nigam was not safe then what about the safety of common people?” He also added that Nigam isn’t only an Indian singer but is well-recognized across the world. Such incidents tarnish the image of India. He also told, "I request Maharashtra Chief Minister Eknath Shinde and state Home Minister Devendra Fadnavis to take strict action against the goon who attacked Singer Sonu Nigam."

Gupta demanded a high-level probe into the Film City fire. 
According to Suresh Shyamlal Gupta, President of All Indian Cine Workers Association, sets of the popular TV serial Ghum Hai Kisikey Pyaar Mein caught fire, which unfortunately spread to nearby sets of serial Teri Meri Doriyaann & Ajooni as well. The President of the Association, Suresh Shyamlal Gupta, emphasized the need for a thorough investigation into the incident.  The fire occurred while more than 1000 people, including artists and workers, were present on set. Gupta said that “many producers, production houses, and channels do not prioritize proper fire safety measures during filming. The biggest thing is a scene that included children being shot at the time of this fire incident. He has asked Eknath Shinde, Chief Minister of Maharashtra to look into the incident and call for a high-level inquiry and for appropriate action to be taken against those responsible, including the Producer, Production House, and Channel, among others. No safety tools were present on the set to extinguish the fire, which is why the fire spread so rapidly and reached other sets! He also demanded fire safety measures from the government and expressed anger that the fire brigade arrived on the set one hour after the fire broke out!”  Gupta said, “The Managing Director of Film City should immediately resign, whose negligence has led to the shooting of a large-scale film production houses without any fire safety measures in place, and where there were no security arrangements.”

References

External links
 
 
 

Living people
Indian trade union leaders
1988 births